Hunters Trace is a neighborhood of Louisville, Kentucky located along Dixie Highway (US 31W) and Upper Hunters Trace.

Neighborhoods in Louisville, Kentucky